Michael Griffith Hopkins (born August 6, 1969) is an American college basketball coach who is the head coach for the Washington Huskies men's team of the Pac-12 Conference. He was a longtime assistant at Syracuse University before taking over for Washington in 2017.

The 6-foot-5 Hopkins, from Laguna Hills, California, was a fan favorite during his playing days at Syracuse, known for his all-out hustle and general scrappy play.

High school career
Born in the Northern California city of San Mateo and raised in the Southern California city of Laguna Hills, Hopkins was a member of the 1987 California state championship team at Mater Dei High School in Santa Ana, California that also featured future NBA player LeRon Ellis. Having graduated from Mater Dei in 1988, Hopkins enrolled at Syracuse while Ellis went on to a two-year career at the University of Kentucky. After Kentucky was placed on probation, Hopkins would play an instrumental role in convincing his high school teammate to transfer to Syracuse.

College career

Hopkins played sparingly in his first two seasons at Syracuse before becoming the team's starting shooting guard in his junior year. That year, Hopkins hit the game-winning free throws with three seconds remaining against Connecticut to propel the Orange to the 1992 Big East Championship.

Hopkins was named captain in his senior season and posted a career high of 9.2 points and added 3.7 rebounds per game. He also had a flair for the clutch, heaving a three-quarter court pass to Conrad McRae for a buzzer-beating, game-winning shot against Villanova. In his final game in the Carrier Dome, Hopkins scored a game-high 20 points and tallied six rebounds and five assists in a 78–74 win over Pittsburgh.

Hopkins played 111 games throughout his four-year career spanning from 1989 to 1993. He finished with averages of 5.7 points and 2.8 rebounds per game.

Professional career

Hopkins spent time in the Continental Basketball Association with the Minnesota-based Rochester Renegade and he also played in Europe with teams in the Netherlands and Turkey.

Coaching career

Hopkins returned to Syracuse in 1995 and was primarily involved with recruiting and the development of guards. Hopkins played a large role in developing future NBA player Jason Hart and SU standout Allen Griffin. He has also been credited for recruiting Gerry McNamara and Billy Edelin.

In May 2007, it was reported that Hopkins was picked to be Jim Boeheim's successor, even though there was no timetable for Boeheim to retire. However, in October, Athletic Director Daryl Gross refuted that story, saying that his quote was taken out of context.

Away from Syracuse, Hopkins was the Court Coach for Team USA in 1998, 2000, 2001, 2010, and 2012.

In March 2010, Hopkins' name surfaced in connection with the head coaching vacancy at Charlotte. Hopkins was reported to be a finalist for the Oregon State University head coaching vacancy in May 2014.

On June 25, 2015, Hopkins was formally named Men's Basketball Head Coach-Designate by Syracuse University.

Hopkins served as Head Coach during Jim Boeheim's controversial nine game suspension from December 5, 2015 to January 5, 2016.

On March 19, 2017, it was announced that Hopkins had been hired as head basketball coach at the University of Washington for the 2017–18 season. Hopkins signed a six-year deal worth $12.3 million. He will earn $1.8 million in his first year and an additional $100,000 each subsequent year of the deal.

Coach Hopkins earned the Pac-12's Coach of the Year award in each of his first two seasons at the University of Washington, while also leading the Huskies to a regular season conference title in the 2018–19 season.

Head coaching record

 Syracuse head coach Jim Boeheim was suspended for nine games, during which Hopkins served as the interim head coach and was credited for those games.

References

External links

 Washington profile

Living people
American expatriate basketball people in the Netherlands
American expatriate basketball people in Turkey
American men's basketball coaches
American men's basketball players
Basketball coaches from California
Basketball players from California
People from Laguna Hills, California
Rochester Renegade players
Shooting guards
Sportspeople from Orange County, California
Syracuse Orange men's basketball coaches
Syracuse Orange men's basketball players
Washington Huskies men's basketball coaches
People from San Mateo, California
1969 births